Timothy Dean Pugh (born January 26, 1967) is a former Major League Baseball pitcher who played for the Cincinnati Reds, the Kansas City Royals, and the Detroit Tigers. He debuted on September 1, 1992 against the Montreal Expos and gave up 3 earned runs in 4 innings. He had been drafted by the Reds in the 6th round of the 1989 amateur draft after playing in college at Oklahoma State. 

As a prep player, Pugh pitched for the Bartlesville High School team that won the Oklahoma class 5A state championship in baseball in 1985.

References

External links

1967 births
Living people
Cincinnati Reds players
Detroit Tigers players
Kansas City Royals players
Major League Baseball pitchers
Nashville Sounds players
Somerset Patriots players
Baseball players from California
St. Paul Saints players
People from Bartlesville, Oklahoma
People from South Lake Tahoe, California
Oklahoma State Cowboys baseball players
Anchorage Bucs players
Billings Mustangs players
Charleston Wheelers players
Chattanooga Lookouts players
Indianapolis Indians players
Richmond Braves players
Toledo Mud Hens players